Giaccio is a surname. Notable people with the surname include:

Orazio Giaccio (fl. 1610s), Italian composer
William G. Giaccio (1924–2000), American politician